Guaiac can refer to:

 Guaiacum, a genus of shrubs and trees native to the Americas
 Oil of guaiac, a fragrance used in soap
 Guaiacol, a natural organic compound derived from Guaiacum
 Stool guaiac test, a test for the presence for occult blood